The Urban Taskforce Australia is an industry organisation representing property development interests in Australia.
It has been described in the media as one of the "most powerful lobby groups" in NSW.

The "sunny face for an often shady business" - offering intimacy with "ministers and senior bureaucrats" and boasts former NSW Liberal premier Nick Greiner and former Labor premier Neville Wran as co-patrons—it describes its membership as "Australia's most prominent property developers and equity financiers".

According to the Taskforce it provides "a forum for people involved in the development and planning of the urban environment to engage in constructive dialogue with both government and the community." Its mission is to promote:  efficient planning and environment laws; quality urban design; increased economic activity; and improved quality of life in urban communities.

History
The Urban Taskforce was founded  in 1999 when a number of property developers and equity property financiers decided that they had a different view of the planning system than dedicated fund managers, asset managers and many property consultants. The founding director of the Urban Taskforce was David Tanevski from KWC Capital Partners who continues in the role of Hon. Secretary Treasurer.

Its started as a NSW only group, but eventually became a national organisation.  While dominated by property developers and equity financiers, its membership also includes "key" builders, architects, urban planners, economists and lawyers involved in the planning and development industry.

Controversy
The Taskforce has not been without controversy. The then Premier of NSW, Bob Carr, launched it in 1999, prompting questions in Parliament. In 2007 the NSW Greens Party gave the Taskforce the dubious honour of a "Bad Developer" award for "most insidious industry lobbying effort" for  its campaign to have the planning laws rewritten to remove local councils from decision-making about developments.  However, the Taskforce also averred that it did not think councils should be stripped of powers altogether.

A Greens Member of Parliament cited with approval the Urban Taskforce’s support for a complete ban on donations to political parties.

Activities
Urban Taskforce's achievements appear to include a cut in developer levies, exempting vast swathes of Sydney's "growth areas" from threatened species laws, and the release of a government discussion paper proposing a wide range of pro-development planning reforms.

References

Business organisations based in Australia
Real estate companies of Australia
Urban development in Australia